Anne Pépin (1747–1837) was an Afro-French signara.  She belonged to the more famous of the so-called signare on the island Gorée in French Senegal, and was known for her relationship with the then governor Stanislas de Boufflers. She was a leading person in the signare community and one of their most known historical representatives.

Life
Anne Pépin was the daughter of the signara Catherine Baudet and the Frenchman Jean Pépin, surgeon of the French East Indies Companie, and the sister of Jean Pepin and the trader Nicolas Pepin. Her brother Nicolas was a leading figure of the island and often as the spokesperson of Gorée in their dealings with the French authorities. It is noted that while Nicolas was literate, Anne was not, albeit her belonged to a very privileged class.  

She married the Frenchman Bernard Dupuy, with whom she had the son Renée Dupy in 1774; her spouse left the island during the yellow fever outbreak in 1779. As was the custom in Gorée, she did not take the name of her husband herself, but nevertheless had her child take her husband's name.

She belonged to the leading figures of the signara community on Gorée Island, which played in important part of the French slave trade.  Her brother had the famous  Maison des Esclaves built for the family slave trade business on the island, typically constructed for a signara house with localities for the storage of slaves in the basement. She kept recalcitrant slaves punished underneath her staircase on Gorée Island. 

Anne Pépin herself owned and constructed several slave trade houses of the same kind, among them a famous house built in a mixed Italo-Provence-style.  As other signaras she would have participated in the slave trade, but she is also known to have traded in Gum arabic, which was officially banned but unofficially condoned by the French. Similar to other signaras, she acquired land and houses which she rented out to the French.

She is famously known for being the signara-mistress of Stanislas de Boufflers, who was the French governor in 1786–1787. Whether they actually had a sexual relationship is not confirmed. The relationship between a Frenchman and a signara did not exclusively signify a sexual union, but the signara and her slaves provided her French client with housing and domestic services such as washing. Stanislas de Boufflers may have lived in her house, and she functioned as his hostess on several famous festivities.

She should not be confused with her niece, Anna Colas Pépin, who became known for a similar relationship with François d'Orléans, Prince of Joinville.

Legacy 
Anne Pépin appears in Segu, an historical novel written by Maryse Condé, under the stereotypical traits of the beautiful aspiring noble lady but neglected signare. She makes her first appearance in chapter 9, part I:As she lay on a mat on the balcony of her house on Gorée Island, Anne Pépin felt bored. She had been bored for ten years, ever since her lover, the Chevalier de Boufflers, who had been governor of the island, went back to France. He had amassed enough money to marry his fair friend the Comtesse de Sabran; Anne still lay awake at night thinking about his ingratitude. She couldn't forget that a few months she had ridden high - given parties, masked balls and theatrical entertainments like those at the court of the king of France. But now it was all over and here she was, abandoned on his chunk of basalt dumped in the sea off Cape Verde, the only French settlement in Africa apart from Saint-Louis at the mouth of the Senegal River.

Notes

Sources 
 Jean Luc Angrand, Céleste ou le temps des Signares, Éditions Anne Pépin.
 Guillaume Vial, Les signares à Saint-Louis du Sénégal au xixe siècle: étude critique d'une identité métisse, Université de Reims, 2 vols, Mémoire de maîtrise, 1997, 407 pp.
 Lorelle Semley, To be Free and French: Citizenship in France's Atlantic Empire
 Mark Hinchman, Portrait of an Island: The Architecture and Material Culture of Gorée ...
 Joseph Roger de Benoist et Abdoulaye Camara, « Les signares et le patrimoine bâti de l'île », dans Abdoulaye Camara & Joseph Roger de Benoist, Histoire de Gorée, Maisonneuve & Larose, 2003

1747 births
1837 deaths
History of Senegal
Senegalese women
18th-century French businesspeople
19th-century French businesspeople
French slave traders
African slave traders
18th-century African people
19th-century African people
French slave owners
African slave owners
Signare
18th-century African businesspeople
Women slave owners
18th-century French businesswomen